Nicholas Abram (1589 at Xaronval, in Lorraine – 7 September 1655), was a Jesuit theologian. He taught rhetoric at Pont-à-Mousson, then engaged in missionary work, and finally taught theology at Pont-à-Mousson for seventeen years.

Works
His principal works are: 

Nonni Panopolitani Paraphrasis Sancti secundum Joannem Evangelii. Accesserunt Notae P.N.A., Soc. Jes. (Paris, 1623); 
Commentarii in P. Virgilii Maronis Bucolica et Georgica. Accessit diatriba de quatuor fluviis et loco paradisi (Pont-à-Mousson, 1633–35);
Pharus Veteris Testamenti, sive sacrarum quaestionum libri XV. Quibus accesserunt ejusdem auctoris de veritate et mendacio libri IV (Paris, 1648). 

His other works may he found in Carlos Sommervogel, Bibliothèque de la compagnie de Jésus (Brussels, 1890).

References

1589 births
1655 deaths
16th-century French Jesuits
French Roman Catholic missionaries
17th-century French Catholic theologians
Jesuit missionaries